Happidrome may refer to:

 Happidrome (radio), a BBC radio comedy series starring Harry Korris
 Happidrome (film), a 1943 film adaptation of the radio series
 "Happidrome", a nickname for the Reporting Room, the RAF Ground-controlled interception radar control room of World War 2